Dylon Powley (born 5 September 1996) is a Canadian soccer coach and former player who played as a goalkeeper.

Club career

Calgary Foothills
In 2016, Powley began playing for Premier Development League side Calgary Foothills and made twelve regular season appearances and five playoff appearances that season. His penalty save against Seattle Sounders U-23 in the Northwest Division playoff game would begin Foothills' run to the PDL Championship that season, where they would ultimately lose out to the Michigan Bucks. He would be named Supporters MVP for the 2016 season. The following season, he made fourteen regular season appearances and one playoff appearance.

Gute
In 2018, Powley went on trial with Swedish Football Division 2 side FC Gute and eventually signed a contract. That season, he made nineteen appearances in all competitions, including one appearance in the Svenska Cupen.

After leaving Gute, Powley spent time on trial with Toronto FC II, where he also trained with the first team.

FC Edmonton
On 17 January 2019, Powley signed with his hometown club, Canadian Premier League side FC Edmonton. On 6 June 2019, he made his debut in the Canadian Championship against York9. He made his league debut against HFX Wanderers on 31 July. After the end of the season on 4 November, Powley was released to explore other options. On 18 December 2019, Powley re-signed with Edmonton for the 2020 season. On 18 January 2021, Powley confirmed his departure from the club.

Atlético Ottawa
In April 2021, Powley signed with Atlético Ottawa for 2021. He led the league in minutes played, finishing with the second most saves in the season, as Atletico finished bottom of the league table. He departed the club at the end of the season. On 1 February 2022, Powley announced his retirement from the sport.

Coaching career
On 15 January 2022, Powley accepted a coaching position with the Vancouver Whitecaps FC Academy in Edmonton.

Career statistics

Club

References

External links

1996 births
Living people
Association football goalkeepers
Canadian soccer players
Soccer players from Edmonton
Canadian expatriate soccer players
Expatriate footballers in Sweden
Canadian expatriate sportspeople in Sweden
Calgary Foothills FC players
FC Gute players
FC Edmonton players
Atlético Ottawa players
USL League Two players
Division 2 (Swedish football) players
Canadian Premier League players
MacEwan University alumni
University and college soccer players in Canada